Giovanni Serao (born 2 March 1977) is an Italian retired footballer.

Career
Serao started his senior career with Padova in Serie A, making five league appearances and scoring a goal against Cagliari, causing him to "almost make a lap of the pitch for joy". However, after leaving the club, he never played at the top level again.

While playing for Novara in Serie C, Serao received an offer from Torino in Serie B, but the transfer never happened and he signed for Chieti in the same division instead.

In 2015, Serao claimed that he treated professional football "in the early years, as a fun and never as a job".

References

External links
 

Italian footballers
Living people
Association football defenders
1977 births
Calcio Padova players
A.C. Prato players
Hellas Verona F.C. players
S.P.A.L. players
Ravenna F.C. players
A.C. Reggiana 1919 players
Novara F.C. players
F.C. Südtirol players
Sportspeople from the Province of Latina
Footballers from Lazio